Live at the Bayerischer Hof is a live album by guitarist James Blood Ulmer which was recorded at the Bayerischer Hof in Munich in 1994 and released on the In + Out label.

Reception

The Allmusic review by Steven McDonald stated, "the performances are very fine indeed. Ulmer's vocal style is engagingly rough and heartfelt, pure blues all the way; this provides an effective contrast to his convoluted guitar work (and the band's support). Ulmer's guitar work is outstanding, transcending the blues label and heading for the outer territories of jazz at quite a rate of knots".

Track listing
All compositions by James Blood Ulmer
 "Burning Up" – 7:06
 "Church" – 9:00
 "Crying" – 7:05
 "Let Me Take You Home" – 4:52
 "Boss Lady" – 8:06
 "Street Bride" – 5:54
 "Blues Allnight" – 8:56 Additional track on vinyl double LP release
 "Timeless" – 5:41
 "Make It Right" – 11:10

Personnel
James Blood Ulmer – guitar, vocals
Amin Ali – electric bass
Aubrey Dayle – drums

References

1994 live albums
James Blood Ulmer live albums